Merlangius merlangus, commonly known as Whiting or merling, is an important food fish in the eastern North Atlantic Ocean and the northern Mediterranean, western Baltic, and Black Sea. In Anglophonic countries outside the Whiting's natural range, the name "whiting" has been applied to various other species of fish.

Description
Merlangius merlangus has three dorsal fins with a total of 30 to 40 soft rays and two anal fins with 30 to 35 soft rays. The body is long and the head small and a chin barbel, if present, is very small. The colour may be yellowish-brown, greenish or dark blue, the flanks yellowish grey or white and the belly silvery. There is a distinctive black blotch near the base of each pectoral fin.

Distribution and habitat
Whiting are native to the northeastern Atlantic Ocean. Their range extends from the southeastern Barents Sea and Iceland to Scandinavia, the Baltic Sea, the North Sea, Portugal, the Black Sea, the Aegean Sea, the Adriatic Sea and parts of the Mediterranean Sea.

In 2014, their conservation status was classified at vulnerable in the Baltic Sea.

Uses
Until the late 20th century, Whiting was a cheap fish, regarded as food for the poor or for pets. The general decline in fish stocks means it is now more highly valued. The other fish that have been given the name Whiting are mostly also edible fish. Several species of the drum, or croaker, family (Sciaenidae) are also called Whiting, among them the northern kingfish (Menticirrhus saxatilis). Whiting was used as a fringe plot point and mise-en-scène in the acclaimed crime drama television series The Wire.

Parasites
Whiting and related other Gadidae species are plagued by parasites. These include the cod worm (Lernaeocera branchialis), a copepod crustacean that clings to the gills or the fish and metamorphoses into a plump, sinusoidal, wormlike body, with a coiled mass of egg strings at the rear.

References

External links

 Fishbase.org entry for Merlangius merlangus
 Distribution map and more

Gadidae
Commercial fish
Fish described in 1758
Fish of the Black Sea
Fish of Europe
Fish of the Mediterranean Sea
Fish of the North Sea
Taxa named by François Alexandre Pierre de Garsault
Taxa named by Carl Linnaeus